Skorovatn Chapel is a parish church of the Church of Norway in Namsskogan municipality in Trøndelag county, Norway. It is located in the old mining village of Skorovatn. It is one of three churches for the Namsskogan parish which is part of the Namdal prosti (deanery) in the Diocese of Nidaros. The brown, wooden church with a red roof was built in a long church style in 1965 using plans drawn up by the architect Arne Aursand. The church seats about 170 people.

History
The church was built in 1965 to serve the mining village of Skorovatn. The church construction was financed by Elkem and the municipality. The church was consecrated on 5 September 1965 by the Bishop Tord Godal. The local mine closed in 1984, so since then, there are only a few residents left in the area, so the chapel is not used as regularly as it used to. It is also occasionally used for concerts.

See also
List of churches in Nidaros

References

Namsskogan
Churches in Trøndelag
Wooden churches in Norway
20th-century Church of Norway church buildings
Churches completed in 1965
1965 establishments in Norway
Long churches in Norway